Erlang is an open source programming language. Multiple development environments (including IDEs and source code editors with plug-ins adding IDE features) have support for Erlang.

Integrated Development Environments (IDEs)

Syntax, parsing, code-assist

Goto, searching

Code generation

Build, debug, run

References

Integrated development environments